Sophie Moleta is an Australian singer, songwriter, composer and teacher with an intimate singing style. She is best known for her piano backed vocals in what can be described as 'folk pop', but has a wide range of recorded music with dance and house music, electronic ambient, laid back jazz and other styles.

Moleta was born in New Zealand, but later moved to Perth, Western Australia. Her non-classical music career started with a local Perth punk band (The Brautigans) where she was backup vocalist and drummer. She has since had an extensive musical career in France, the UK, and has in recent years lived in New Zealand and latterly Australia.

Discography
Albums except as noted
Stoop Only To Love (1996)
Trust (1998)
Dive (2000)
The Cowshed Session (2000)
Live in Lille (France) (2000)
"Love Has Come Again" (2000) single (with Human Movement)
Les Jolies Choses (2001) (two tracks - film soundtrack & soundtrack album)
Temple (2001)
Grow in Love (2001)
Accept (2002)
My Style of Sensual (2003)
What Happened in Fremantle? (2004) (with David Härenstam)
Untie Me (2005) (with Holmes Ives)
Live at LaSalle (Singapore) (2005)
"Te-Atawhai" (3 track single) (2006) and separate video/DVD of the title track
"Awaken" (2006) original track from Untie Me in nine remix versions
Every Girl I Know Deserves a Packet of Stars (2007) (14 tracks + video)
plus various dance releases on vinyl
plus tracks on more than 25 CD compilations
plus numbers of collaborations on other releases
plus a growing number of remixes of her work
 SatyaKadambiiMela-"Truth is"( 2012)
The birth of Love ep  released on band camp  October 2015

References

External links
Sophie Moleta Facebook
Sophie Moleta website

Year of birth missing (living people)
Living people
New Zealand emigrants to Australia
Moleta, Sophie